Hamid Taqavi (1955 – 27 December 2014) was a brigadier general in the Iranian Islamic Revolutionary Guard Corps and a commander in Quds Force.

A veteran of Iran–Iraq war, he was reportedly killed in late 2014 by an Islamic State of Iraq and the Levant sniper while on “an advisory mission” in Iranian-led intervention against ISIL.

Military career

Iran–Iraq war 
He joined the Islamic Revolutionary Guard Corps immediately after the start of Iran–Iraq war in 1980 and recruited forces from Dasht-e Azadegan, forming a Military Intelligence Unit in Susangerd. He fought in some operations, including Operation Kheibar and Operation Dawn 8, where his father and brother were killed. During the war, he was promoted to Ramazan Headquarters command.

War on ISIL 
According to Badr Organization head Hadi al-Amiri, he “was present in most of the important battles against ISIL and played a key role in Liberation of Jurf Al Sakhar”.

"Taqavi was killed while conducting the mission in cooperation with the Iraqi army and popular mobilization forces to counter the ISIL Takfiri militants in the vicinity of the shrine of the eleventh Shia Imam, Hasan al-Askari", according to a statement by Public Relations Department of the Islamic Revolutionary Guard Corps.

On 30 December, Thousands of Revolutionary Guards gathered in Tehran for the funeral, including Qassem Soleimani. Ali Shamkhani said "If people like Taqavi do not shed their blood in Samarra, then we would shed our blood in Sistan,  Azerbaijan, Shiraz and Esfahan [to defend Iran]”.

References 

1955 births
2014 deaths
Islamic Revolutionary Guard Corps brigadier generals
People from Ahvaz
Islamic Revolutionary Guard Corps personnel of the Iran–Iraq War
Quds Force personnel
Ahwazi Arabs
People of the War in Iraq (2013–2017)
Iranian Arab military personnel